Hecto (symbol: h) is a decimal unit prefix in the metric system denoting a factor of one hundred. It was adopted as a multiplier in 1795, and comes from the Greek  , meaning "hundred". In 19th century English it was sometimes spelled "hecato", in line with a puristic opinion by Thomas Young. Its unit symbol as an SI prefix in the International System of Units (SI) is the lower case letter h.

The prefix is rarely used in general, but has certain specific applications:
 hectopascal (hPa), in meteorology, for atmospheric pressure, the modern equivalent of the traditional millibar.
 hectolitre (hl or hL), in agriculture, for liquids (notably wine and milk) and bulk commodities (e.g., grain).
 hectometre (hm), in radio astronomy, occasionally used to indicate a radio band by wavelength
 In surveying, a square hectometre is called a hectare (ha, or 100 ares = 1 hm2 = 10,000 m2).

See also
 Metric prefix
 Numeral prefix

References

SI prefixes
100 (number)